Blue Spring Creek is a stream in eastern Morgan County and western Miller County in the U.S. state of Missouri. It is a tributary of Little Gravois Creek.

Springs including Blue Spring occur about midway along the stream course near the Missouri Route Z crossing.

Blue Spring Creek is fed by a spring characterized by its blue water, hence the name.

See also
List of rivers of Missouri

References

Rivers of Morgan County, Missouri
Rivers of Miller County, Missouri
Rivers of Missouri